Pryor Edward McBee (June 20, 1901 – April 19, 1963) was a pitcher in Major League Baseball who appeared in one game as a reliever for the 1926 Chicago White Sox.

References

External links

1901 births
1963 deaths
Major League Baseball pitchers
Chicago White Sox players
Baseball players from Oklahoma
Sportspeople from Roseville, California
People from Pittsburg County, Oklahoma